The Mauritania women's national football team represents Mauritania in international women's football and is controlled by the Football Federation of the Islamic Republic of Mauritania (FFIRM). The team played its first international match in 2019 as a friendly against Djibouti in which they lost three to one. Fatou Dioup scored Mauritania's first international goal.

History

The team
In 1985, almost no country in the world had a women's national football team, including Mauritania who did not play in a single FIFA sanctioned match between 1950 and June 2012. The country did not have a FIFA recognised national senior or junior team in 2006, and was unchanged in 2009. In 2010, the country did not have a team competing in the African Women's Championships during the preliminary rounds. The country did not have a team competing at the 2011 All Africa Games. In March 2012, the team was not ranked in the world by FIFA.

Federation
The national association, the Football Federation of the Islamic Republic of Mauritania, was founded in 1961 and became a FIFA affiliate in 1964. Women's football is not represented by rule in the federation and they do not employee anyone specifically to look after women's football. The federation has not participated in any FIFA sanctioned training courses for women's football. Most of the funding for women's football in the country and for the women's national team comes from FIFA, not the national football association.

Background and development
Football is the second most popular women's sport in the country, behind basketball which is number one. In 2006, there were 100 registered female football players in the country, the first time such numbers were tracked.  Opportunities for play are limited as there are only four women's football teams in the country, women's football is not organised at schools, and mixed football is not allowed.

The lack of development of the national team on a wider international level is symptomatic of wider problems on the continent, including limited access to education, poverty amongst women in the wider society, and fundamental inequality present in the society (especially present in Muslim-majority religious state countries, Mauritania being one such country) that occasionally allows for female-specific human rights abuses. Early development of the women's game at the time colonial powers brought football to the continent was limited as colonial powers in the region tended to take make concepts of patriarchy and women's participation in sport with them to local cultures that had similar concepts already embedded in them. Continent wide, if quality female football players do develop, they leave for greater opportunities abroad. Future, success for women's football in Africa is dependent on improved facilities and access by women to these facilities.  Attempting to commercialise the game and make it commercially is not the solution, as demonstrated by the many youth and women's football camps held on the continent.

Team image

Nicknames
The Mauritania women's national football team have been nicknamed the "Mourabitounes".

Results and fixtures

 
The following is a list of match results in the last 12 months, as well as any future matches that have been scheduled.

2023

Coaching staff

Current coaching staff

Manager history
  Abdallahi Diallo (2019–)

Players

Current squad

The following list is the final squad for 2023 WAFU Zone A Women's Cup in January 2023.

Caps and goals accurate up to and including 9 July 2021.

Recent call-ups
The following players have been called up to a Mauritania squad in the past 12 months.

INJ Player withdrew from the squad due to an injury.
PRE Preliminary squad.
SUS Player is serving a suspension.
WD Player withdrew for personal reasons.

Previous squads
First match selection
WAFU Zone A Women's Cup
2023 WAFU Zone A Women's Cup squads

Records

*Active players in bold, statistics correct as of 2021.

Most capped players

Top goalscorers

Competitive record

FIFA Women's World Cup

*Draws include knockout matches decided on penalty kicks.

Olympic Games

*Draws include knockout matches decided on penalty kicks.

Africa Women Cup of Nations

*Draws include knockout matches decided on penalty kicks.

African Games

WAFU Women's Cup record

Arab Women's Championship

All−time record against FIFA recognized nations
The list shown below shows the Tunisia national football team all−time international record against opposing nations.
As of 26 October 2021 after match against .
Key

See also

Sport in Mauritania
Football in Mauritania
Women's football in Mauritania
Mauritania women's national under-20 football team
Mauritania women's national under-17 football team

References

External links
Fédération de Football de la République Islamique de Mauritanie 

َArabic women's national association football teams
W
African women's national association football teams